Hiroyuki Deguchi (born 17 January 1953) is a Japanese biathlete. He competed at the 1976 Winter Olympics, the 1980 Winter Olympics and the 1984 Winter Olympics.

References

1953 births
Living people
Japanese male biathletes
Olympic biathletes of Japan
Biathletes at the 1976 Winter Olympics
Biathletes at the 1980 Winter Olympics
Biathletes at the 1984 Winter Olympics
Sportspeople from Hokkaido